Ondřej Šedivý (born September 30, 1989) is a [Czech professional ice hockey player. He is currently under contract with HC Frydek-Mistek of the 1st Czech Republic Hockey League (Czech. 1).

He previously played with home province club, HC Vítkovice in the Czech Extraliga during the 2010–11 Czech Extraliga season. and with HC TWK Innsbruck of the Austrian Hockey League (EBEL).

References

External links

1989 births
Living people
Czech ice hockey right wingers
HC Frýdek-Místek players
HC TWK Innsbruck players
HC Vítkovice players
Orli Znojmo players
People from Bohumín
Sportspeople from the Moravian-Silesian Region
HC Havířov players
HC Oceláři Třinec players
HC Olomouc players
Czech expatriate ice hockey people
Czech expatriate sportspeople in Austria
Expatriate ice hockey players in Austria
GKS Tychy players
Czech expatriate sportspeople in Poland
Expatriate ice hockey players in Poland